Iablanița is a commune in Caraș-Severin County, western Romania with a population of 2281 people. It is composed of three villages: Globu Craiovei (Globukrajova, formerly Kiskirálymező), Iablanița and Petnic (Petnek).

Of the commune's inhabitants whose ethnicity was recorded at the 2011 census, 98.6% were Romanians and 1.3% Roma. 90% were Romanian Orthodox and 9.3% Baptist.

Attractions include an 1836 wooden church in Globu Craiovei and the 1825 Iablanița church, both historic monuments; and a nature reserve.

References

Communes in Caraș-Severin County
Localities in Romanian Banat
Place names of Slavic origin in Romania